Festival Thyme is an EP precursor to the full-length album The Century of Self by the American art rock band ...And You Will Know Us by the Trail of Dead. It was released through Richter Scale Records imprint, via Justice Records.

Track listings
Compact Disc and all other formats
 "Bells of Creation" (Machete Mix) – 5:32
 "Inland Sea" (EP Edit) – 3:41
 "Festival Thyme" – 2:17
 "The Betrayal of Roger Casement & the Irish Brigade" – 5:44

Limited edition vinyl picture disc
 "Bells of Creation" (Machete Mix)
 "Within Your Reach" (Paul Westerberg)
 "Festival Thyme"
 "The Betrayal of Roger Casement & the Irish Brigade"

Personnel
 Conrad Keely – vocals, guitar, drums, piano
 Jason Reece – drums, vocals, guitar
 Kevin Allen – guitar, vocals
 Aaron Ford – drums, piano, vocals
 Jay Phillips – bass, vocals
 Clay Morris – piano, vocals

References

External links

Full track sampler at Last.fm
"Inland Sea" at Stereogum
"Bells of Creation" at Pitchfork Media
"Bells of Creation" at RCRD LBL

...And You Will Know Us by the Trail of Dead albums
2008 EPs